Nazeer (foaled 9 August 1934 in Egypt) was a gray  Arabian stallion from Egypt. He was sired by Mansour out of Bint Samiha.

He sired many offspring, among the best-known were Aswan, Ansata Ibn Halima, Hadban Enzahi (1952), and Morafic.

His maternal great-grandsire, Sotamm, was a horse of bloodlines all tracing to the horses imported by Wilfrid and Lady Anne Blunt from stud of Ali Pasha Sherif.  Sotamm was born in England, and then sold to the Egyptian government by Lady Wentworth of the Crabbet Arabian Stud.

Pedigree

References

Individual Arabian and part-Arabian horses
1934 animal births